The Turkish Stars are the aerobatic demonstration team of the Turkish Air Force and the national aerobatics team of Turkey.

The team was formed on November 7, 1992, and was named the Turkish Stars on January 11, 1993.

Turkish Stars fly with eight Canadair NF-5 fighter planes obtained from the Royal Netherlands Air Force, making them one of few national aerobatics teams to fly supersonic aircraft. Twelve NF-5 fighter planes are available to the team. The team uses CASA/IPTN CN-235, C-130 and C-160  support aircraft in Turkish Stars colours. The team is stationed at the Konya Air Base of 3rd Main Jet Base Group Command. As a part of modernization programs of the Turkish Air Force, the NF-5 aircraft are planned to be replaced with locally produced TAI Hurjet in mid 2020s.

On August 24, 2001, the Turkish Stars demonstrated at an airshow to more than one million people in Baku, Azerbaijan, setting a world record.

Leadership
Current squadron leader Major Esra Özatay assumed the role on 8 September 2016. She is the first and only female pilot to hold this position in the Turkish Air Force.

Incidents
On 13 March 2012, one of the team's NF-5 fighter planes crashed during a training session in Konya Province,  from the airbase where the team is stationed. Pilot Flight lieutenant Ümit Özer, who had joined the Turkish Stars shortly before, died in the crash.

On 7 April 2021, an NF-5 fighter plane crashed during a training session near Karatay. Pilot Flight lieutenant Burak Gençcelep died in the crash.
	
On 6 December 2022, during a training flight, an NF-5 collided with a bird causing engine failure. The pilot ejected and was confirmed to be unharmed.

See also
Turkish Air Force

References

External links 

 Turkish Stars website
 Virtual Turkish Stars website
 Turkish Stars at Bucharest International Air Show 2018

Turkish Air Force
Aerobatic teams
Konya Province
1992 establishments in Turkey
Military units and formations established in 1992